The Fortier River (in French: rivière Fortier) is a tributary of the Bécancour River (via William Lake. It flows in the municipalities of Vianney and Saint-Ferdinand, in the L'Érable Regional County Municipality (MRC), in the administrative region of Centre-du-Québec, in Quebec, in Canada.

Geography 

The main neighboring watersheds of the Fortier river are:
 north side: Bécancour River, ruisseau Pinette;
 east side: Bécancour River;
 south side: ruisseau Gardner;
 west side: ruisseau Larose, ruisseau Pinette.

  towards north, crossing "Route de Vianney", descending the mountain, to the fifth rang road;
  north, crossing the sixth rang road, collecting the water of the discharge of lake Tanguay (coming from west), collecting water from ruisseau Larose and crossing route 165 in the hamlet Woodside, up to the mouth.

The Fortier river empties on the south-est bank of the Bécancour River (via William Lake) at the end of a peninsula which located north of Langlois Bay. This confluence is located 3.3 km north-west of the downtown of Saint-Ferdinand.

Toponymy 
The term "Fortier" turns out to be a family name of French origin.

The toponym "rivière Fortier" was made official on August 17, 1978, at the Commission de toponymie du Québec.

See also 

 List of rivers of Quebec

References 

Rivers of Chaudière-Appalaches
L'Érable Regional County Municipality